The 2019 Pirelli GT4 America Series was the inaugural season of the GT4 America Series. It took over the GTS class of the Pirelli World Challenge, which adopted global GT4 technical regulations in 2018, and it is a Blancpain GT World Challenge America support series. GT4 America Series is split into a Sprint series, which features 50-minute races with one driver per car, and a SprintX series, which features one-hour races with two drivers per car and a mandatory driver change during Pit stops. Also East and West regional championships are awarded. The season began on 2 March in Austin and ended on 20 October in Las Vegas.

Calendar
At the annual press conference during the 2018 24 Hours of Spa on 27 July, the Stéphane Ratel Organisation announced the first draft of the 2019 calendar. The date for the season opening weekend in Austin was confirmed on 15 August. Finalized schedules were announced on 29 September. An official announcement, concerning the races at Las Vegas Motor Speedway that carry the 'Grand Finale' name, is forthcoming.

SprintX

Sprint

Entry list

SprintX

Sprint

Race results
Bold indicates overall winner.

SprintX

Sprint

Championship standings
Scoring system
Championship points are awarded for the first ten positions in each race. Entries are required to complete 75% of the winning car's race distance in order to be classified and earn points. Individual drivers are required to participate for a minimum of 25 minutes in order to earn championship points in any SprintX race.

Drivers' championships

SprintX

Sprint Overall

Sprint Am Cup

Teams' championships

SprintX

Sprint

Manufacturers' championships

SprintX

Sprint

See also
2019 Blancpain GT World Challenge America

Notes

References

External links

GT4 America Series